István Láng (born 1 March 1933) is a Hungarian composer.

Life
Born in Budapest, Láng  studied composition there from 1950 to 1958 at the Franz Liszt Academy of Music, first with János Viski and later with Ferenc Szabó. After graduating, he worked as a freelance composer until 1966. From 1966 to 1984 he was Musical Adviser to the State Puppet Theatre, and in 1973 he joined the staff of the chamber music branch of the Liszt Academy. He also held guest lectureships at the University of Colorado in 1973, CNM in Mexico City in 1987, and the University of New Mexico in 1988. He served as Secretary General of the Association of Hungarian Musicians from 1978–90, was a member of the Executive Committees of the International Society for Contemporary Music and the International Music Council (UNESCO) in 1984–87 and 1989–93, respectively.

He has twice been awarded the Erkel Prize (in 1968 and 1975), was made Artist of Merit in 1985, and has won the Bartók-Pásztori Prize in 1994.

Musical style
In his early mature works, Láng adopted the serial techniques that had become fashionable in the early 1960s, showing the influence of Boulez and Schoenberg, but still managing a clever and effective synthesis of these styles with traditional Hungarian elements derived from Bartók in all areas: melody, harmony, rhythm, and texture—a synthesis perhaps best demonstrated in his Variations and Allegro (1965), which is an arrangement of an earlier symphony. His music from this period is marked by an absorption with the theatre, even in chamber and solo instrumental works, such as Monodia for clarinet, which is intended for stage or concert performance. Other important works from the sixties are the first two Wind Quintets (1963 and 1966), a ballet on Thomas Mann's Mario and the Magician (1962), and a Chamber Cantata to words by Attila József (1962). Another feature of Láng’s style is the use of cyclic form, and his later music tends to consist of sequences of short movements constructed from small motifs, which he calls "micro-organisms". These traits are found, for example, in his Second Wind Quintet of 1966 and Third String Quartet of 1978. The movements in such works are often linked by improvisatory solo interludes, as in the Second String Quartet of 1966.

Although Láng also worked briefly with electronic music as early as 1974 (Surface Metamorphoses), he turned seriously to this medium beginning only in the late 1990s, for example Esteledés (Nightfall, 1997), which uses live electronics to manipulate sounds of a trumpet and Korean bell. More recent works with electronics are the Capriccio metronomico for tape (2001), and the Third Chamber Cantata, "No Man Is an Island", to words of John Donne (2001), for soprano, five instruments, and tape.

References
 Hollós, Máté. 2003. "'Nem vagyok elég öreg ahhoz, hogy ne újítsak'" ["I am not old enough not to innovate"]. Muzsika 46, no. 4 (April): 3–4.
 Kárpáti, János. 1975. "Láng István. II: Kamarazene" [Láng II: chamber music], Muzsika 18, no. 11 (November): 34–36.

Footnotes

1933 births
20th-century classical composers
21st-century classical composers
Hungarian classical composers
Hungarian male classical composers
Living people
Members of the European Academy of Sciences and Arts
Musicians from Budapest
20th-century Hungarian male musicians
21st-century Hungarian male musicians